Joel Karlström (born 17 May 2001) is a Finnish professional footballer who plays at FC Åland as a midfielder.

Club career
On 31 March 2021, he joined Swedish club Husqvarna FF on loan for the 2021 season.

Career statistics

References

2001 births
Living people
Finnish footballers
Association football midfielders
IFK Mariehamn players
Husqvarna FF players
Veikkausliiga players
Finnish expatriate footballers
Expatriate footballers in Sweden
Finnish expatriate sportspeople in Sweden